The Bean Peaks are a group of peaks, including Carlson Peak and Novocin Peak, which form the southwest part of the Hauberg Mountains. They were first sighted from the air by the Ronne Antarctic Research Expedition, 1947–48, and mapped by the United States Geological Survey from ground surveys and from U.S. Navy air photos, 1961–67. They were named by the  Advisory Committee on Antarctic Names for Lawrence D. Bean, electrician with the South Pole Station winter party in 1967.

References
 

Mountains of Palmer Land